The initials RSN may refer to:

"Real Soon Now"
Regional sports network
Renal Support Network
Republic of Singapore Navy
Resort Sports Network
Robust Security Network in IEEE 802.11i-2004 (WPA2)
Royal School of Needlework
RSN Racing & Sport 

RSn may refer to:
Organotin chemistry and related compounds